The Democrata Party, also known as Partido Democrata Nacional was a political party in early 20th century Philippines, when the Philippines was an insular territory of the United States. It functioned as an opposition party against the ruling Nacionalista Party.

History 
The Democrata Party came from the remnants of the Progresista Party, which had been defeated by the Nacionalistas. Juan Sumulong founded the Democrata party in 1917, espousing "absolute and immediate independence".

In the 1922 election, the Nacionalistas were split into two camps: Senate President Manuel L. Quezon pushed for collective leadership, calling Speaker Sergio Osmeña's leadership style as "unipersonal", a charge Osmeña denied. Thus, Quezon and his allies were the "Colectivistas", while Osmeña and his allies were the "Unipersonalistas". Osmeña decided to run for the Senate, directly challenging Quezon's authority. This led to the Nacionalistas losing their majority in the House of Representatives. The Democratas, who had the balance of power, approached Osmeña for having their own senators vote for him as Senate President; in response to the Unipersonalistas voting for the Democrata's Claro M. Recto as Speaker. Osmeña refused, however, and reconciled with Quezon, thus merging the two nationalist camps into the Partido Nacionalista Consolidato (Consolidated Nationalist Party).

Ironically, by 1933, Quezon and Osmeña were again at odds, this time on the issue of the Hare–Hawes–Cutting Act. The Democratas allied with Quezon and his allies, known as the "Antis", against Osmeña and his allies, who were for the law (the "Pros". The Antis won, replacing the previous Act with the Tydings–McDuffie Act, whose provisions which Sumulong had pushed for earlier as a Progresista.

By the time of the 1935 election, the Democratas were subsumed into the Antis, and later, they reunited with the Nacionalista Party. In the turn of events, another movement, the Fuente Popular (Popular Front) functioned as the opposition to the Nacionalistas moving forward.

Electoral performance

Senate

House of Representatives

References 

1917 establishments in the Philippines
Defunct political parties in the Philippines